Ryan Cavalieri is a professional remote control car driver from Southern California he has won four IFMAR World Champion titles and more than 30 national titles. He has worked with most major RC Brands with cars by Team Associated, WRC Works and Schumacher. His electroical partner has also been varied including Orion and hobbywings

References

External links 
Official Facebook Page
Official Instagram Page
Official YouTube Channel

Living people
RC car racing drivers
Radio-controlled car personalities
American racing drivers
Associated Electrics people
Kyosho